Brockview is a neighbourhood in the city of St. Catharines, Ontario, Canada, and the home of Brock University. The community is centered at Brock University. To the north are the Niagara Escarpment and Lockhart Drive, to the west is Brock University, to the south is St. David's Road, and to the east is Highway 406.

Map

Schools 
 Brock University

Churches 
 Resurrection Lutheran Church
400 Glenridge Avenue

Gallery

External links 
 Brock University's official website

Neighbourhoods in St. Catharines